"Dinosaur Adventure 3D" is the second single by Underworld from their album A Hundred Days Off. The single, released in 2003, peaked on the UK Singles Chart at number 34.

Track listing

CD: Junior Boy's Own, JBO5020523 (UK) Part 1/2 
 "Dinosaur Adventure 3D (Radio Edit)" - 3:39
 "Ansum" - 16:16

CD: Junior Boy's Own, JBO5020528 (UK) Part 2/2 
 "Dinosaur Adventure 3D (R.C.M. Version)" - 8:09
 "Like A Swimmer" - 5:25
 "Dinosaur Adventure 3D (Funk D'Void Vocal Remix)" - 6:16

CD: Junior Boy's Own, JBO5022063 (EU) 
 "Dinosaur Adventure 3D (Radio Edit)" - 3:39
 "Dinosaur Adventure 3D (R.C.M. Version)" - 8:09
 "Dinosaur Adventure 3D (Funk D'Void Vocal Remix)" - 7:53
 "Ansum" - 16:16

CD: V2, V2CP 142 (JP) 
 "Dinosaur Adventure 3D (Radio Edit)" - 3:39
 "Dinosaur Adventure 3D (R.C.M. Version)" - 8:09
 "Dinosaur Adventure 3D (Funk D'Void Vocal Remix)" - 7:53
 "Dinosaur Adventure 3D (Darren Price Remix)" - 7:24

CD: Junior Boy's Own, (UK) promo 
 "Dinosaur Adventure 3D (Radio Edit)" - 3:39
 "Dinosaur Adventure 3D (R.C.M. Version)" - 8:09
 "Dinosaur Adventure 3D (Funk D'Void Vocal Remix)" - 7:54
 "Dinosaur Adventure 3D (Sharpside Remix)" - 9:24
 "Dinosaur Adventure 3D (Darren Price Remix)" - 7:24
 "Dinosaur Adventure 3D (Chicken Lips Version Adventure)" - 11:56

CD: Junior Boy's Own, (US) promo 
 "Dinosaur Adventure 3D (Radio Edit)" - 3:39
 "Dinosaur Adventure 3D (R.C.M. Version)" - 8:09
 "Dinosaur Adventure 3D (Funk D'Void Remix Fade)" - 6:29
 "Dinosaur Adventure 3D (Funk D'Void Remix Full Length)" - 7:54
 "Dinosaur Adventure 3D (Sharpside Remix)" - 9:24
 "Dinosaur Adventure 3D (Chicken Lips Version Adventure)" - 11:56
 "Dinosaur Adventure 3D (Darren Price Remix)" - 7:24
 "Ansum" - 16:16
 "Like A Swimmer" - 5:25

12": Junior Boy's Own, JBO5020526 (UK) 
 "Dinosaur Adventure 3D (R.C.M. Version)" - 8:09
 "Dinosaur Adventure 3D (Funk D'Void Vocal Remix)" - 6:16

12": Junior Boy's Own, JBO5020526P (UK) promo 1/3 
 "Dinosaur Adventure 3D" - 7:55
 "Dinosaur Adventure 3D (R.C.M. Version)" - 8:09

12": Junior Boy's Own, JBO5020520P (UK) promo 2/3 
 "Dinosaur Adventure 3D (Funk D'Void Vocal Remix)" - 6:28
 "Dinosaur Adventure 3D (Darren Price Remix)" - 7:24

12": Junior Boy's Own, JBO5020529P (UK) promo 3/3 
 "Dinosaur Adventure 3D (Sharpside Remix)" - 9:24
 "Dinosaur Adventure 3D (Chicken Lips Version Adventure)" - 11:56

12": V2, V2AB-27775-1 (US) promo 1/2 
 "Dinosaur Adventure 3D (Sharpside Remix)" - 9:24
 "Dinosaur Adventure 3D (Funk D'Void Vocal Remix)" - 7:54

12": V2, V2AB-27776-1 (US) promo 2/2 
 "Dinosaur Adventure 3D (R.C.M. Version)" - 8:09
 "Dinosaur Adventure 3D (Darren Price Remix)" - 7:24

12": V2, 63881-27778-1 (US) promo 
 "Dinosaur Adventure 3D (R.C.M. Version)" - 8:09
 "Dinosaur Adventure 3D (Sharpside Remix)" - 9:24

Video
The video for the song begins with a gradually zooming-out shot of a beehive. A swarm of mechanical bees then emerge from the hive and attack a city. A large amount of papers blow around a fleeing man, while the bees watch. The bees then kidnap several people. Following are multiple shots of the bees flying over scenery, taking everyone they see. The kidnapped people then emerge from water, their ultimate fate unknown. The bees return to their hive.

Charts

Notes
The "Funk D'Void Vocal Remix" had to be edited down so that the CD complied with UK chart rules of 20 minutes; the full version of this track appears on the Australian 'AHDO' tour edition 2×CD set.

References

External links
Underworld discography pages at dirty.org
Underworldlive.com
Single information from the unofficial Underworld discography web site - BigScreenSatellite
Dinosaur Adventure 3D Video Clip

Underworld (band) songs
2003 singles
2002 songs
Songs written by Rick Smith (musician)
Songs written by Karl Hyde